Julienne, or French cut, is a culinary knife cut in which the food item is cut into long thin strips, similar to matchsticks.

Trimming the ends of the vegetable and the edges to make four straight sides makes it easier to produce a uniform cut. A uniform size and shape ensures that each piece cooks evenly and at the same rate. Once julienned, turning the subject 90 degrees and dicing finely will produce brunoise. 

The first known use of the term in print is in François Massialot's  (1722 edition). The origin of the term is uncertain. 

A  is composed of carrots, beets, leeks, celery, lettuce, sorrel, and chervil cut in strips a half- in thickness and about eight or ten  in length. The onions are cut in half and sliced thinly to give curved sections, the lettuce and sorrel minced, in what a modern recipe would term . The root vegetables are briefly sauteed, then all are simmered in stock and the julienne is ladled out over a slice of bread.

See also
 Mandoline

References

External links

Cutting techniques (cooking)
Food preparation techniques
Culinary terminology